Alder is a surname. Notable people with the surname include:

 Alan Alder (1937–2019), Australian ballet dancer
 Alison Alder (born 1958), Australian screenprinter
 Berni Alder (1925–2020), German-born American physicist 
 Christian Alder (born 1978), German footballer
 Christopher Alder (196098), British former soldier who died in police custody; see Death of Christopher Alder
 Danny Alder (born before 2007), Australian actor
 Don Alder (born before 1985), Canadian fingerstyle guitarist
 Douglas D. Alder (born 1932), American historian and academic administrator
 Esther Alder (born 1958), Swiss politician
 Fred Alder (18891960), Australian rules footballer
 Henry Alder (18741949), Australian rules footballer
 Janine Alder (born 1995), Swiss ice hockey goaltender
 Jim Alder (born 1940), British distance runner who competed in the 1968 Summer Olympics
 John C. Alder (born 1944), English musician better known as "Twink"
 Jonathan Alder (17731849), American pioneer
 Joshua Alder (17921867), British zoologist and malacologist
 Kurt Alder (190258), German chemist, co-winner of the 1950 Nobel Prize in Chemistry
 Alder (crater), a lunar crater named after Kurt Alder
 Diels–Alder reaction, a chemical reaction named after Otto Diels and Kurt Alder
 Mike Alder (born before 2004), Australian mathematician and writer
 Ray Alder (born 1967), American singer with the band Fates Warning
 Roger Alder (born before 2005), British organic chemist
 Thomas Alder (193268), German actor
 Vera Stanley Alder (18981984), English portrait painter and mystic

 Other people named Alder
 George Alder Blumer (18571940), British-born American physician, mental hospital administrator and journal editor
 Rhondda Alder Kelly (19262014), Australian beauty queen
 William Alder Strange (181374), English headmaster and author
 Charles Romley Alder Wright (184494), English chemist and physicist

See also 
 Alford & Alder, a British former automotive engineering company
 Gregory Scott Aldering (born 1960), American astronomer
 Alda (name)
 Alders (disambiguation)
 Allder (disambiguation)